Faith Coloccia is an American artist and musician. She is most known as being the founding member and primary songwriter for the post-rock band Mamiffer. Coloccia has also been a member of Everlovely Lightningheart, Pyramids, House of Low Culture and Split Cranium. In 2009, she co-founded the independent record label SIGE Records with her husband Aaron Turner (Isis, Sumac).

Music career 
Faith Coloccia describes one of her first bands Everlovely Lightningheart as being a large experiment that extended beyond the writing sessions. In an interview, she said the project included everything "from my friendship with [band mate] Chris Badger, to the ways we lived our lives, how we talked, what we made, how we viewed the world, everything. It encompassed our whole lives and was very much based on chaos" and elaborated that the band "the project focused on improvisational abilities, chance, collaborations, freaking ourselves out, unlearning old patterns of thinking, and was barely contained."

After Everlovely Lightningheart disbanded, Coloccia took some of her unused ideas from the project and formed Mamiffer. The band started out as a collaborative project with a new cast of revolving guest musicians on each new album, but grew into a duo project between her and Turner with Coloccia remaining the primary songwriter and creative visionary. Coloccia has also been a part of several other bands. She briefly joined Turner's drone project House of Low Culture. She joined Rich Balling's (Rx Bandits, The Sound of Animals Fighting) collaborative project Pyramids. After guesting on Turner's crust punk band's self-titled debut album, Coloccia returned as an official member performing keyboard for their second album I'm The Devil And I'm OK in 2018.

In 2010, Coloccia formed the record label SIGE Records with Turner as a way to release albums they were directly or loosely related to. SIGE also grew out of an interest to maintain control over their releases, have their products hand-made when possible and cut out as many middlemen as possible in an album's creation process.

She released her first solo album (under the moniker Mára) titled Surfacing in December 2015.

Artwork 
Coloccia is a photographer, artist and graphic designer. As a child, she was surrounded and influenced by several creative types who drew her toward creating art. Her mother and her mother's friends were involved in theatre, her father was a carpenter, and her childhood babysitter's house that "was made into different worlds and lands, sculpted terrains, and imaginary places" also inspired her. Coloccia's interest in photography developed in part by her father and grandfather's interests in taking photos and flipping through issues of Rolling Stone  and Martha Stewart Living magazines as a child. She majored in Fine Arts Photography at Otis College of Art & Design, where she met Chris Badger of Everlovely Lightningheart.

She has created artwork and designed the layout for dozens of albums for her own projects and others including: Knut's Wonder (2010), Helms Alee's Weatherhead (2011), and Old Man Gloom's No (2012) and The Ape of God / The Ape of God (2014).

Discography

Everlovely Lightningheart 
 Cusp (2006, Hydra Head)
 Sien Weal Tallion Rue (2009, Hydra Head)

Pyramids 
 Pyramids with Nadja (collaboration with Nadja) (2009, Hydra Head)
 A Throne Without a King (split with Horseback) (2011, Hydra Head)

Mamiffer 

 Hirror Enniffer (2008, Hydra Head)
 Mare Decendrii (2011, Conspiracy)
 Bless Them That Curse You (collaboration with Locrian) (2012, Profound Lore)
 Enharmonic Intervals (for Paschen Organ) (collaboration with Circle) (2013, Ektro)
 Statu Nascendi (2014, SIGE)
 Crater (collaboration with Daniel Menche) (2015, SIGE)
 The World Unseen (2016, SIGE)
 The Brilliant Tabernacle (2019, SIGE)

House of Low Culture 
 Poisoned Soil (2011, Taiga)

Barnett + Coloccia 
 Retrieval (2013, Blackest Ever Black)
 Weld (2015, Blackest Ever Black)
 VLF (2019, SIGE)

Baker / Coloccia / Mueller 
See Through (2019, Gizeh)

Mára (solo) 
 Surfacing (2015, SIGE)

Split Cranium 
 I'm The Devil And I'm OK (2018, Ipecac)

Faith Coloccia 
 Stardust w/ Philip Jeck (2021, Touch)

As guest

References

External links 
 Fire in Fog – Faith Coloccia's personal blog
 Faith Coloccia discography on Discogs

Year of birth missing (living people)
Living people
American rock keyboardists
American women singer-songwriters
American women artists
21st-century American women